Gustav Czimeg (December 20, 1877 – August 21, 1939) was a German actor of the silent period. He appeared in films such as Madame DuBarry (1919),  in which he played Duke Aiguillon, Die Rache des Titanen (1919), Glasprinzessin (1921), and One Does Not Play with Love (1926).

References

External links
 

1877 births
1939 deaths
20th-century German male actors
German male silent film actors